Operation Delta Force 5: Random Fire is a 2000 American direct-to-video action film, starring Trae Thomas, Todd Jensen and Anthony Bishop. It was directed by Yossi Wein.

Plot
An elite task force is assigned to handle a Middle-Eastern terrorist mastermind who is using mind-control techniques to create an army of willing suicide bombers.

Cast

Reception

References

External links
 
 

2000 films
American action films
American direct-to-video films
Films about Delta Force
Films directed by Yossi Wein
2000s English-language films
2000s American films